The Hip-Hop Violinist is the third studio album and major label debut by violinist Miri Ben-Ari, released on September 20, 2005 through Universal Records.

Track listing

U.S. track listing

Notes
Miri Ben-Ari samples Dvořák's "9th Symphony New World (4th Movement)"
The song "Jump & Spread Out" has been wildly misattributed as a remix of Zion and Lennox's song "Yo Voy" featuring Daddy Yankee, since they contribute to this song with some lyrics from their own song. The song has also been alternately titled "¿Dónde Están Las Mamis?" from their Motivando a la Yal: Special Edition CD.

References

2005 debut albums
Miri Ben-Ari albums
Albums produced by Akon
Albums produced by Kanye West